Scott Perkins (born June 25, 1980) is an international prize-winning composer, a tenor, an award-winning scholar, and a music educator. 

His music includes art songs, musical theatre, solo instrumental works, choral music, electroacoustic installations, and music for film and church, and has been performed throughout North America and Europe. 

The judges who awarded him a BMI Student Composer Award described his winning work as “a dramatic and strikingly beautiful example of choral writing which speaks to the heart as well as to the mind.” He has collaborated with musical and non-musical artists, including Tony Award-winning playwrights, Emmy-winning filmmakers, and prize-winning poets.

Early life and education
Perkins was born in New Britain, Connecticut, on June 25, 1980, to Catherine and Henry Perkins. He moved to Bristol, Connecticut, three years later. He began composing at the age of five; a year later, one of his pieces was performed on the carillon bells at Trinity College, in Hartford, CT. He studied composition at the Hartt School at age twelve, and won his first competition at 14; his winning work was performed by the Hartford Symphony Orchestra. 

Perkins was an active participant and, later, a leader in his middle- and high-school music programs, and was selected as a member of regional, and All-State bands and choirs as an alto saxophonist and a baritone singer. He graduated from Bristol Central High School in 1998.

Perkins studied music theory and composition with Martin Amlin, Richard Cornell, Charles Fussell, and Marjorie Merryman at the Boston University College of Fine Arts. He minored in vocal performance; his voice teachers were William Hite and Joy McIntyre. He won several departmental awards and prizes, and he graduated with highest honors in 2002.

He then pursued graduate studies in music theory pedagogy at the Eastman School of Music, earning a Master of Arts degree in 2004. He began a double-degree Ph.D. in music theory and composition but eventually elected to complete his degree in only composition with minors in music theory and music history. During his studies, he earned a second master's degree in music theory. His primary composition teacher was Ricardo Zohn-Muldoon, and his dissertation was advised by Zohn-Muldoon, William Marvin, and David Liptak. His dissertation comprised ‘’The Revolt of the Angels’’ (a six-movement work for organ, electric violin, and orchestra) and a thesis on the influence of Benjamin Britten’s ‘’Missa Brevis in D’’ on his ‘’War Requiem’’. An early version of his thesis was named the best student paper presented at an American Musicological Society chapter meeting.

Career
While at Eastman, Perkins served on the faculty of Nazareth College; he also taught courses at Eastman. He concertized as a tenor throughout the country and abroad, gave presentations on musical topics at Harvard University and the University of Chicago, directed choral ensembles, and co-founded the music organization Encore Music Creations. He moved to New Haven, Connecticut in 2010 and concentrated on writing music for the church and for theatre. 

His sacred choral music is performed throughout the United States and is published by Augsburg Fortress. In 2011, he scored Sir Peter Shaffer’s play, ‘’The Gift of the Gorgon’’ in collaboration with the playwright. The play was performed at Guild Hall in East Hampton, New York, starring Alec Baldwin and directed by Tony Walton. His short opera "Charon," written with librettist Nat Cassidy, was commissioned by the Washington National Opera as part of its inaugural American Opera Initiative. 

It was premiered on November 19, 2012, at the Kennedy Center in Washington, D.C., and received strong reviews: Philip Kennicott of the Washington Post wrote, “‘Charon’. . . works effectively because it establishes and maintains a single mood, intensifying to a dramatic conclusion. Melodic vocal fragments are set against more dissonant but colorful sounds in the instrumental ensemble.” Terry Ponick, writing for the Washington Times Communities praised Perkins for having “perfectly orchestrated” the “haunting music,” and he applauded Perkins and Cassidy for having created a work that makes a “visceral connection to [our] own times.”

In the fall of 2012, Perkins was appointed Assistant Professor of Music at DePauw University, where he taught courses in composition, music theory, and musicianship until 2015. He has also served as Instructor of Choral Studies at Interlochen Arts Camp and on the faculty at Central Connecticut State University and Nazareth College. In fall, 2017, Perkins joined the faculty of California State University, Sacramento.

References

External links
 Scott Perkins's webpage
 Scott Perkins: Sacramento State University Faculty Page
 Scott Perkins's Album "The Stolen Child"

American choral conductors
American male conductors (music)
1980 births
Living people
Boston University College of Fine Arts alumni
University of Rochester alumni
DePauw University faculty
21st-century American composers
Choral composers
Classical composers of church music
American male classical composers
20th-century American composers
Musicians from Connecticut
Eastman School of Music alumni
20th-century American conductors (music)
21st-century American conductors (music)
20th-century American male musicians
21st-century American male musicians